Satya Prakash Agarwal is an Indian politician and a member of the 17th Legislative Assembly of Uttar Pradesh of India. He represents the Meerut Cantt. constituency of Uttar Pradesh and is a member of the Bharatiya Janata Party political party.

Early life and  education
Satya Prakash  Agarwal was born in Meerut district, Uttar Pradesh. He was educated at Meerut.

Political career
Satya Prakash Agarwal has been a MLA for four straight terms. He represents the Meerut Cantt. constituency and is a member of the Bharatiya Janata Party political party.

Posts held

See also
Meerut Cantt.
Sixteenth Legislative Assembly of Uttar Pradesh
Uttar Pradesh Legislative Assembly

References 

People from Meerut district
Uttar Pradesh MLAs 2002–2007
Uttar Pradesh MLAs 2007–2012
Uttar Pradesh MLAs 2012–2017
Uttar Pradesh MLAs 2017–2022
1939 births
Living people
Bharatiya Janata Party politicians from Uttar Pradesh
Politicians from Meerut